Calling All Kings & Queens is a sampler album of alternative rock songs by artists on the San Francisco, California based lesbian-feminist independent record label, Mr. Lady Records. It was released in March, 2001, following on from the label's first sampler released in 1999, entitled New Women's Music Sampler.

Track listing 
California Lightening: "Lugosi" – 2:53
Le Tigre: "Sweetie" – 2:45
Navy: "Safe Harbors" – 3:13
Amy Ray: "Lucy Stoners" (live) – 4:02
Darien Brahms: "Whistle Boat" – 3:09
Kiki and Herb: "I'm Not Waiting" (Sleater-Kinney) – 2:13
Sleater-Kinney:"Ballad of a Ladyman" (live) – 3:05
The Sissies: "Everything in the World" – 2:10
Heart Beats Red: "Set Me Up" – 2:28
PME: "Cherries in the Snow" – 3:38
The Crowns: "Shallow End" – 2:36
The Butchies: "Disco" (live) – 3:08
Tracy + the Plastics: "Oh Maria" – 2:27
Origami: "Nancy Drew/Lions & Tigers" – 3:05
Shelley Doty: "Seems Unlikely" – 4:14
oriflamme: "My Own Private Ryan" – 2:35
V for Vendetta: "The Fall of Terrok Nor" – 4:54
Gretchen Phillips: "Eau Du Lesbianism" – 6:15

References

External links 
 [ Allmusic album entry]
 Discogs.com album entry

Lesbian feminist mass media
Record label compilation albums
Women in music
2001 compilation albums